Clyde Robert Brawley (born April 10, 1944) is a former  Republican member of the North Carolina General Assembly.
 
He represented the state's 43rd House district, including constituents in Catawba and Iredell counties (later the 101st district and now the 95th district) from 1981 until he retired in 1998.  While in office, Brawley was elected the President of the National Republican Legislators Association and was named National Legislator of the Year in 1995.

Brawley ran for North Carolina Commissioner of Insurance in 2004, losing to James E. Long.

In 2012, Brawley was again elected to the House from the Iredell County-based 95th district. He won the May 8 Republican primary, which was tantamount to election, since no Democrat filed for the seat as it is a Republican leaning district. Meanwhile, Brawley was also in 2012 named to lead the North Carolina chapter of the Faith and Freedom Coalition, a potential conflict of interest.

In April 2013, Brawley filed House Bill 640 that would allow lobbyists to give unreported gifts to state lawmakers in North Carolina.

In May 2013, Brawley resigned as chairman of the House Finance Committee in a dispute with House Speaker Thom Tillis. Brawley lost his bid for another term in the May 2014 Republican primary, with some of his colleagues in the House campaigning against him. Afterwards, the House Republican Caucus passed a vote of "no confidence" in Brawley, effectively barring him from caucus meetings. Brawley suggested that the censure was in retaliation for his criticism of Tillis.

On December 9, 2015, Brawley announced his candidacy for the office of Governor of North Carolina, challenging incumbent Pat McCrory. He ended up losing the Republican primary to McCrory on March 13, 2016 as McCrory had incumbency advantage behind him.

References

External links
 Robertbrawleync.com (Campaign site)

|-

|-

Republican Party members of the North Carolina House of Representatives
Living people
1944 births